Jirachai Linglom (born 13 October 1978 in Thailand) is a Thai sprinter who competed in the 2000 Summer Olympics and other prestigious track and field competitions. Linglom's two main events are the 400 metre hurdles and the 4 x 400 metre relay.

International competitions

Personal bests

References

External links 
 Jirachai Linglom mini biography
 Jirachai Linglom's profile by All-Athletics

1978 births
Living people
Athletes (track and field) at the 2000 Summer Olympics
Jirachai Linglom
Athletes (track and field) at the 1998 Asian Games
Athletes (track and field) at the 2002 Asian Games
Jirachai Linglom
Southeast Asian Games medalists in athletics
Jirachai Linglom
Competitors at the 2001 Southeast Asian Games
Jirachai Linglom
Jirachai Linglom
Jirachai Linglom